"Unless You Care" is a song written by P.F. Sloan and Steve Barri and performed by Terry Black.  It reached No. 2 on Canada's RPM Top 40 & 5 and No. 99 on the U.S. Billboard Hot 100 in 1964. The song was featured on his 1965 album, Only 16.

The song was produced by Sloan and Barri.  Glen Campbell and Leon Russell, who were session musicians at the time, performed on the record.

Other versions
Johnny Chester released a version of the song as a single in 1965 that went to No. 65 in Australia.
Bobby Curtola released a version of the song as a single in 1969 in Canada, but it did not chart.

References

1964 songs
1964 singles
1969 singles
Songs written by P. F. Sloan
Songs written by Steve Barri
Terry Black songs
Tollie Records singles